Miles Mitchell, better known as Mr. Mitch, is a British grime record producer from London. He was a founding member of Boxed, a club night and label formed in 2012 with Oil Gang, Logos and Slackk.

He has released music on numerous labels including Planet Mu and his own Gobstopper Records imprint.

Mr. Mitch's sound in recent years has moved away from a Grime-focus towards a more pop-oriented feel.

Discography

Studio albums

Extended plays

References

English record producers
Black British musicians
Grime music artists
Year of birth missing (living people)
Living people
Planet Mu artists